Freddy Adrian Garcia Felix (born August 1, 1972) is a Dominican retired Major League Baseball infielder. He played during four seasons at the major league level for the Pittsburgh Pirates and Atlanta Braves.

External links

1972 births
Living people
Atlanta Braves players
Azucareros del Este players
Carolina Mudcats players
Calgary Cannons players
Dominican Republic expatriate baseball players in Canada
Dominican Republic expatriate baseball players in Japan
Dominican Republic expatriate baseball players in the United States

Lynchburg Hillcats players
Major League Baseball left fielders
Major League Baseball players from the Dominican Republic
Major League Baseball third basemen
Medicine Hat Blue Jays players
Nashville Sounds players
Nippon Professional Baseball first basemen
Nippon Professional Baseball third basemen
Osaka Kintetsu Buffaloes players
Pawtucket Red Sox players
People from La Romana, Dominican Republic
Pittsburgh Pirates players
St. Catharines Blue Jays players